Larantuka is a kecamatan (district) and the seat capital of East Flores Regency, on the eastern end of Flores Island, East Nusa Tenggara, Indonesia. Like much of the region, Larantuka has a strong a colonial Portuguese influence. The town had 37,348 inhabitants at the 2010 census and 40,828 at the 2020 census. This overwhelmingly (95.4%) Roman Catholic area enjoys some international renown for its Holy Week celebrations.

Larantuka Malay (also known as Ende Malay), a local dialect over 80% cognate with Indonesian, is used as a lingua franca in this area. Portuguese is used in certain Catholic religious rituals.

History

Briefly before 1600 Portuguese traders left Solor and settled in Larantuka. The traders were in conflict with the Dominicans in Solor, because they were more interested in trade than in Christianization. In 1613 the Dutch occupied Solor and the Dominicans moved to Larantuka, too.

Larantuka was a nexus for the trade of sandalwood from Timor and became the Portuguese trading center of South East Indonesia. It was also a refuge for deserters of the Dutch East India Company (VOC).

Two waves of immigration brought additional population. As the Dutch conquered Malacca in 1641, many Portuguese moved to Larantuka. Two villages, Wureh and Konga, accommodated the new arrivals. As the Dutch attacked Makassar in 1660, most of the Portuguese from there also came to Larantuka.

The Portuguese took indigenous wives, but they always wrote down the Portuguese ancestry. This new population group was called Topasses, but they called themselves Larantuqueiros (inhabitants of Larantuka). The Dutch called them also Zwarte Portugeesen ("black Portuguese").

The Larantuqueiros turned out a loose, but mighty power in the region, which influence reached far beyond the settlement. The core cell was the federation of Larantuka, Wureh and Konga. Theoretically they were subordinated to Portugal. But in practice they were free. They had no Portuguese administration and they did not pay taxes. Letters of the Lisbon government were ignored. For long years there was a bloody struggle for power between the families da Costa and de Hornay. At the end they shared the power.

The Larantuqueiros made "alliances" with the indigenous people of Flores and Timor. They followed a certain strategy; the most notable raja was converted to Catholicism by military pressure. He had to take an oath of allegiance to the king of Portugal and thereon the title Dom was granted to him. The raja was allowed to rule his folk autonomously, but in war he had to supply auxiliary forces.

The Larantuqueiros were the rulers and established Portuguese as the official language to distance themselves from the natives. The language of commerce was the Malay language, which was understood on the surrounding islands.

In 1640 the Larantuqueiros settled in Lifau on Timor to gain control over the sandalwood of Timor. From Lifau they expanded to the island's hinterland where sandalwood grows. With strong forces the sovereigns there were compelled to enter into negotiations. For the delivery of musketry the Larantuqueiros gained control over most of the sandalwood production and were able to control the price.

Trade was flourishing when the “white Portuguese” came by order of the king of Portugal to exert influence on Timor. But they were besieged by the Larantuqueiros and left empty-handed in 1769. In 1854 the Portuguese offered the Dutch the sovereign rights for sale. The contract was ratified in 1859.

The Dutch sent a military and administrative officer, who took residence in a small fort. But they do not really take influence on the population.

Larantuka offered little promise, after the downturn of the sandalwood trade. The Larantuqueiros resorted to farming. Not much was left of the former profitable foreign trade.

Formally the Larantuqueiros were Catholics, but the control of the belief was devolved to laymen organisations, which gave the belief a new direction. In Larantuka the most powerful organisation was A Confraria da Rainha do Rosário, the brotherhood of the rosary queen, which exists still this day.

The contract between the Portuguese and the Dutch respected religious freedom. Thus Dutch Calvinism did not take root. However Dutch Jesuits engaged in missionary work. Starting in Larantuka with building the first rectory and reintroduced the orthodox form of Catholicism again. Monogamy was reinforced due their influence. The missionaries even built Catholic schools and brought health care.

With the independence of Indonesia the Larantuqueiros gained new influence. They were able to reach leading positions, because they had a more high level of education than then natives. Even the Indonesian language, which became the new official language, was easy for them, because it is very similar to the Malay language.

Present
Indonesia Tourism describes: Larantuka is a neat clean seaport with a beautiful view. Everything is within walking distance except for the pier where the boats leave for Timor (4-5 km from town). [...Larantuka is a] little port nestled at the base of a tall hill at the eastern end of Flores, from where Solor, Adonara, and Lembata islands (the small islands near by) are visible across the narrow strait. [...] people are very outgoing and friendly. Their bemos are brightly painted with murals on the sides and their radios are blasting the latest tunes. Lots of Catholic churches line the roads with a few mosques sprinkled in. [...] There are a number of tuna boats at the docks. They have a big square platform on the bow where fishermen line up with bamboo poles line up flipping hooked tunas.

Holy Week

"Semana Santa" (Holy Week), the week before Easter, is an important time of religious celebration for the devoutly Catholic people of the Diocese of Larantuka. The celebrations center on two religious statues, one of Jesus Christ and one of Virgin Mary brought by Portuguese missionaries Gaspar do Espírito Santo and Agostinho de Madalena in the 16th century. These statues are only presented to the public every Easter and are kept out-of-view for the rest of the year.

The religious festivities begin on Wednesday before Easter, known locally as Rabu Trewa or "Shackled Wednesday" in remembrance of the betrayal of Judas Iscariot that led to Jesus's arrest and shackling. Devotees surround the chapel of Tuan Ana where the statue of Jesus is kept, shouting in Latin to mourn the arrest of Jesus by Roman soldiers. Devotees likewise surround the chapel of Tuan Ma in nearby Lohayong village where the statue of Virgin Mary is kept.

On Holy Thursday, devotees enact the tikam turo ritual that prepares the route of the next day's seven kilometer procession by planting candles along the road. After the candle are prepared, devotees attend the munda tuan ritual in which members of a religious fraternity known as the Konfreria Reinha Rosaria (Brotherhood of the Queen of Roses) bath the statues of Jesus and Mary. The holy water used is afterwards considered special and is saved to cure ill children and to help women having birth complications.

On the morning of Good Friday, the raja of Larantuka opens the door of the chapel of Tuan Ma thus making may for devotees to enter. His own clan, the Diaz Vieira de Godinho, enter first followed by the brotherhood members and the rest of the population. Worshipers kiss the statue of Mary and pray for divine benevolence per Mariam ad Jesum (through Mary to Jesus).

Meanwhile, the statue of Jesus is taken from the chapel in Larantuka and is brought on a seven kilometer long procession by land and sea. The procession has eight stops, each representing a major clan of Larantuka (among which are the Mulawato, Sarotari, Amakalen, Kapitan Jentera, Fernandez da Gomez, Diaz Pohon Sirih, and Diaz Vieira de Godinho clans). At each stop there is a small chapel where a short prayer and devotional singing honor the suffering of the Passion. When the statues of Jesus and Mary are united, they are brought together to Larantuka Cathedral where many devotees attend a Good Friday service that lasts all night.

Transportation
The area is served by Gewayantana Airport.

Climate
Larantuka has a tropical savanna climate (Aw) with a long dry season and short wet season.

See also
Kingdom of Larantuka

References

External links
 Semana Sancta Tradition in Larantuka

Populated places in East Nusa Tenggara
Districts of East Nusa Tenggara
Flores Island (Indonesia)
Regency seats of East Nusa Tenggara
1859 establishments in the Dutch Empire